ePLDT Ventus, Inc., now rebranded as SPi CRM, is a subsidiary of the Philippine Long Distance Telephone Company (PLDT), a telecommunications provider in the Philippines. ePLDT Ventus operates eight customer contact centers across the Philippines.

Corporate Overview
Founded in 2001, The company employs more than 7,000 staff and personnel.  Recently, it signed a contract with the Philippine Airlines (PAL) to handle its contact center services.

References

PLDT subsidiaries
Call centre companies
Business process outsourcing companies of the Philippines
Companies based in Makati